Rand Refinery (Pty) Limited is the largest integrated single-site precious metals refining and smelting complex in the world. It was established in 1920 to refine gold within South Africa which until that time had been refined in London.

History 
It was established in 1920 in Germiston, South Africa, by the Chamber of Mines of South Africa to refine all the gold produced by South Africa's gold mines instead of in London. As of 1919, the Bank of England would receive consignments of raw gold from the producers and issue it to individual refineries, refined and then returned to the Bank for sale, and the hope was that after the Rand Refinery was built, the gold industry would still be financed in London and that the refined gold would be sold in the latter. On 27 November 1920, Rand Refinery Ltd was registered as a private company, the capital raised from shares of gold mining companies that were members of the Chamber of Mines. Building of the facilities commenced in August 1920. Low quality ingots would be received from the gold mines and then refined to 99.6% purity and then sold to the South African Reserve Bank for sale around the world on the London and Zurich bullion markets. By 1922, the supply of gold to London was almost nonexistent and impacted the two major UK refiners, Johnson Matthey and Rothschild.

Products 
In recent years, Rand Refinery has evolved from a pure refiner of doré to a more rounded company with an emphasis on beneficiation. It facilitates a wide range of value-added products including: 
 
 cast bars
 minted bars
 minted coins
 coin blanks and medallions
 semi-fabricated products for the jewellery manufacturing industry

By law the South African Mint Company is the only company allowed to manufacture South African legal tender coins such as the world famous Krugerrand.  All the gold used to manufacture the coins is supplied by Rand Refinery, who has been appointed the sole supplier of bullion Krugerrands to primary distributors both locally and internationally.

In addition to its smelting and refining services Rand Refinery offers metallurgical, logistics and vault services. It acts as an agent for its precious metal depositing customers and its global markets business unit markets all the precious metal produced by the refinery.

References

External links
Rand Refinery website
SAMINT website
Rand Refinery - world`s largest gold refinery

Metal companies of South Africa
Buildings and structures in Germiston
Gold industry
Companies based in Germiston